Llaniestyn may refer to:
, Wales
Llaniestyn, Gwynedd, Wales